Timo Jurkka (born 6 October 1963, in Helsinki) is a Finnish actor, the son of actor Sakari Jurkka.

Jurkka is also a musician. He writes songs and composes as well as performs songs accompanied with guitar. Jurkka has performed in the theatre of Espoo, in the summer theatre of Pyynikki and in Theatre Jurkka.

Filmography
 Salatut elämät 1999 TV-series (Lasse Sievinen 2004–2012, 2013–2015)
 Rotanloukku 2003 TV
 Sokkotanssi 1999 (Police)
 Force majeure 1999 (Ilkka Rajala)
 Säädyllinen murhenäytelmä 1998 (Artur, Naimi's husband)
 "Kvartetti" 1991 (mini) TV-series (Member of quartet)
 Pyörteissä 1990 (TV) (Lover)
 Paratiisin kahleissa 1989 (TV) (Pasi)
 Uuno Turhapuro armeijan leivissä 1984

References

1963 births
Living people
Male actors from Helsinki